LDU  stands for:

Lahu Democratic Union
Land disposal unit, a term in bioremediation
 LDU decomposition, a factorization of matrices found in linear algebra
 Liga Deportiva Universitaria (disambiguation)
 Local Delivery Unit - Last three digits of a Canadian postal code
 Ring of Independents, a former political party in Switzerland
 IATA code for Lahad Datu Airport